Ellakkala is a suburb close to Nittambuwa in Gampaha Administrative District.

Most Ellakkala lands are within Attanagalle Pradeshiya Sabha while some parts within Mirigama Pradeshiya Sabha. Specially lands are between Ellakkala and Meevitiya.

Adjoining suburbs are Haggalla, Walaliyedda, Godagama, Meevitiya, Katakaalapitiya, Allalamulla and Ma-Imbula.

Attractions 

Traditional Pattini Dewol is a famous site in December. There are many parades. Patthini Devalaya, Ma-imbula, paddy terraces, Ellakkala Buddhist nuns monastery, Buddhist monastery at Weralugaslanda, Buddhist Vihara at Meevitiya.

Education 

Ellakkala Maha Vidyalaya is the only Government-funded school in the area which accommodates students from Grade 1 to Grade 13.

Administrative divisions

Climate 

Ellakkala features a tropical rainforest climate. Has no true dry season, though it is noticeably drier in the months of January and February. When it compares with many areas with this type of climate, temperatures show little variation throughout the year. Average temperatures hovers at around 26 °C throughout the year.

References

Populated places in Gampaha District